Mein Kampf is a 1960 Swedish documentary film about the rise and fall of Adolf Hitler directed by Erwin Leiser. It film started in 1959 and was a large box office success.

US Release
It was admired by George Seaton and William Perlberg who saw it in Copenhagen and they suggested Paramount buy it. The studio refused and instead the film was bought by Columbia for distribution in the United States for $50,000. It became a surprise hit in the US where it grossed an estimated $1.45 million.

German Release
The film used footage from Triumph of the Will. It was seen in a Munich cinema by Leni Riefenstahl who recalled she was "rendered speechless by what I saw on the screen" and considered it "a gross infringement of copyright and also intellectual theft." She sued for copyright infringement and accepted a financial settlement.  Another company took over the case on Riefenstahl's behalf but lost in what was known as the "Minerva decision" which ruled that copyright in Triumph of the Will was not owned by Riefenstahl.

References

External links
Mein Kampf at IMDB
Mein Kampf at Letterbox DVD
Mein Kampf at TCMDB

Swedish documentary films
Swedish black-and-white films
1960s Swedish films
1960 films
1960 documentary films